

See also
American Football League

Sources

American football records and statistics
American Football League